Marisa Lino (born August 12, 1950) is an Italian-born American retired diplomat who served as the U.S. Ambassador to Albania between 1996 and 1999.

Early life
Lino was born in the Free Territory of Trieste, today part of Italy, but grew up in Portland, Oregon from the age of five. She received an M.A. in international affairs from The George Washington University's Elliott School of International Affairs in 1972 and B.A. in political science from Portland State University in 1971. In May 1999, she received an honorary doctorate of international affairs from John Cabot University. She also completed a Certificate in Advanced Engineering Studies at M.I.T. in a mid-career program and did post-graduate work at the University of Zagreb (then in the former Yugoslavia).

Career
Her career at the State Department included overseas postings in Albania, Italy, Pakistan, Syria, Iraq, Tunisia and Peru. She was the United States ambassador to Albania between 1996 and 1999.

After retiring from the Foreign Service, she was director of the Bologna Center of the Paul H. Nitze School of Advanced International Studies (SAIS), Johns Hopkins University, between 2003 and 2006. In 2007, she became International Affairs Advisor to Secretary Michael Chertoff at the Department of Homeland Security, and later was named  Assistant Secretary for International Affairs.

References

1950 births
Living people
Ambassadors of the United States to Albania
Johns Hopkins University faculty
People from Portland, Oregon
Portland State University alumni
United States Department of Homeland Security officials
Elliott School of International Affairs alumni
United States Foreign Service personnel
American women ambassadors
20th-century American diplomats